Minnesota State Highway 278 (MN 278) was a state highway in Minnesota, originally connecting MN 100 in Robbinsdale to MN 152 in Minneapolis. It existed entirely in Hennepin County. The route was decommissioned in 1982.

Route description 
When authorized, Highway 278 began at MN 100 and followed 36th Avenue North along the border of Crystal and Robbinsdale. Upon reaching U.S. Route 52 (West Broadway), it traveled southeast concurrent with 52 and State Highway 218 to Lowry Avenue. It then followed Lowry Avenue east into Minneapolis, crossing U.S. Route 169 at Lyndale Avenue and ending at State Highway 152 (Washington Avenue).

History 
MN 278 was authorized in 1949. In 1978, the western terminus was moved to US 52 from the previous MN 100, transferring the 36th Avenue North portion of the route to Robbinsdale city maintenance. In 1982, the remaining section of the route was decommissioned and transferred to county maintenance, becoming part of Hennepin County Road 153.

Major intersections

References

External links

278